Beatrice Mompremier (born August 8, 1996) is an American basketball player who plays for the Atlanta Dream in the Women's National Basketball Association (WNBA). She was drafted 20th overall in the 2020 WNBA draft by the Los Angeles Sparks after playing college basketball for the Miami Hurricanes.

College career
Mompremier attended Baylor University after graduating from Miami Senior High School in 2015. After two seasons, she transferred to her hometown Miami Hurricanes.

During the 2018–19 season, Mompremier was a named an honorable mention All-American by the Associated Press as well as a first-team All-ACC selection. Despite being eligible for the 2019 WNBA draft, she opted to return to Miami for her senior season. Following the 2019–20 season, Mompremier was named an Honorable Mention All-American by the Associated Press.

Professional career

Los Angeles Sparks
She was selected with the 20th overall pick in the 2020 WNBA draft by the Los Angeles Sparks. Following the draft, she signed a contract with the Sparks but was released on June 1 - ultimately not making the roster.

Connecticut Sun
On June 23, 2020, she signed with the Connecticut Sun as a replacement for all-star Jonquel Jones, who chose to sit-out the 2020 WNBA season. On May 4, 2022, Mompremier was waived from training camp.

Atlanta Dream
On May 6, 2022, the Dream claimed Mompremier off of the waiver wire.

Career statistics

College

Source

|-
| style="text-align:left;"| 2015–16
| style="text-align:left;"| Baylor
| 38 || 26 || 14.9 || .535 || .000 || .406 ||6.1 || 0.7 || 0.7 || 1.6 || 1.8 || 7.2
|-
| style="text-align:left;"| 2016–17
| style="text-align:left;"| Baylor
| 32 || 10 || 14.5 || .550 || .000 || .578 || 6.5 || 0.5 || 0.1 || 1.5 || 1.7 || 8.3
|-
| style="text-align:left;"| 2017–18
| style="text-align:left;"| Miami
| style="text-align:center;" colspan="12"|  Redshirt
|-
| style="text-align:left;"| 2018–19
| style="text-align:left;"| Miami
| 33 || 32 || 29.5 || .528 || .333 || .579 || 12.2 || 0.9 || 0.9 || 1.0 || 2.8 || 16.7
|-
| style="text-align:left;"| 2019–20
| style="text-align:left;"| Miami
| 17 || 14 || 25.9 || .521 || .308 || .705 || 9.8 || 0.6 || 1.1 || 1.4 || 3.4 || 16.8
|-
| style="text-align:left;"| Career
| style="text-align:left;"| 5 years, 2 team
| 120 || 82 || 20.4 || .532 || .313 || .565 || 8.4 || 0.7 || 0.6 || 1.4 || 2.3 || 11.5

WNBA career statistics

Regular season

|-
| align="left" | 2020
| align="left" | Connecticut
| 21 || 0 || 8.9 || .426 || .000 || .444 || 3.3 || 0.1 || 0.2 || 0.6 || 0.7 || 2.3
|-
| align="left" | 2021
| align="left" | Connecticut
| 32 || 0 || 8.6 || .491 || .000 || .417 || 2.4 || 0.2 || 0.4 || 0.3 || 0.6 || 1.8
|-
| align="left" | 2022
| align="left" | Atlanta
| 21 || 0 || 8.3 || .455 || .000 || .385 || 2.8 || 0.4 || 0.1 || 0.6 || 0.7 || 2.1
|-
| align="left" | Career
| align="left" | 3 years, 2 teams
| 74 || 0 || 8.6 || .458 || .000 || .419 || 2.8 || 0.2 || 0.3 || 0.5 || 0.6 || 2.0

Postseason

|-
| align="left" | 2020
| align="left" | Connecticut
| 7 || 0 || 12.3 || .333 || .000 || .400 || 3.6 || 0.1 || 0.6 || 0.9 || 0.4 || 1.7
|-
| align="left" | 2021
| align="left" | Connecticut
| 2 || 0 || 3.5 || .500 || .000 || .000 || 1.0 || 0.5 || 0.0 || 0.0 || 0.5 || 1.0 
|-
| align="left" | Career
| align="left" | 2 years, 1 team
| 53 || 0 || 8.7 || .460 || .000 || .433 || 2.8 || 0.2 || 0.3 || 0.4 || 0.6 || 2.0

Overseas

National competition

Regular season

Playoff

International competition

Personal
Mompremier is of Haitian descent and speaks Haitian Creole as well as English.

References

1996 births
Living people
American women's basketball players
American sportspeople of Haitian descent
Baylor Bears women's basketball players
Basketball players at the 2019 Pan American Games
Basketball players from Miami
Connecticut Sun players
Atlanta Dream players
Forwards (basketball)
Los Angeles Sparks draft picks
McDonald's High School All-Americans
Miami Hurricanes women's basketball players
Pan American Games medalists in basketball
Pan American Games silver medalists for the United States
Medalists at the 2019 Pan American Games